Angenent is a surname. Notable people with the surname include:

Henk Angenent (born 1967), Dutch speed skater
Sigurd Angenent (born 1960), Dutch-born American mathematician and professor
Angenent torus